Perfection Savannah Jordan 

Perfection may also refer to:

Film and television
The Perfection, a 2018 American film
Perfection (game show), a 2011–2015 British quiz show
Perfection, a fictional locale in the Tremors franchise

Music
Perfection, an 1840 operetta by Stanisław Moniuszko

Albums
Perfection (album), an album by the Murray, Allen & Carrington Power Trio
Perfection, by Foesum, 1996
Perfection (Sandra Bernhard EP) or the title song, 2008
Perfection (Super Junior-M EP) or the title song, 2011

Songs
"Perfection" (Dannii Minogue song), 2005
"Perfection", by Badfinger from Straight Up, 1971
"Perfection", by Clint Mansell from Black Swan: Original Motion Picture Soundtrack, 2010
"Perfection", by Oh Land from Oh Land, 2011
"Perfection", by Oli London, 2019

Other uses
Perfection (board game), a Hasbro board game
Perfection (comics), a Marvel Comics character
Perfection (law), a concept in property law
Perfection Pass, Baffin Island, Nunavut, Canada
Perfection Racing, a Danish auto racing team
Christian perfection, a Christian doctrine

See also

Perfect (disambiguation)
Perfectionism (disambiguation)